The following is a list of football stadiums in Bulgaria, ordered by capacity. Stadiums with a capacity of 5,000 or more are included.

Future stadiums

Old stadiums

See also
 Football in Bulgaria
 List of football clubs in Bulgaria

External links
  Pictures of stadiums in Bulgaria
List of Stadiums Pictures in Bulgaria

 
stadiums
Bulgaria
Football stadiums